Zoline is a surname. Notable people with the surname include:

Joseph T. Zoline (1912–2004), American businessman
Pamela Zoline (born 1941), American writer and painter

See also
Oline (name)